Northwest Aitkin is an unorganized territory in Aitkin County, Minnesota, United States. The population was 342 at the 2010 census.

Geography

Demographics
At the 2000 census there were 335 people, 125 households, and 101 families in the unorganized territory.  The population density was 1.2 people per square mile (0.4/km2).  There were 289 housing units at an average density of 1.0/sq mi (0.4/km2).  The racial makeup of the unorganized territory was 97.31% White, 0.90% Native American, and 1.79% from two or more races. Hispanic or Latino of any race were 2.09%.

Of the 125 households 26.4% had children under the age of 18 living with them, 72.8% were married couples living together, 7.2% had a female householder with no husband present, and 18.4% were non-families. 15.2% of households were one person and 7.2% were one person aged 65 or older.  The average household size was 2.68 and the average family size was 2.98.

The age distribution was 24.5% under the age of 18, 5.4% from 18 to 24, 25.1% from 25 to 44, 29.0% from 45 to 64, and 16.1% 65 or older.  The median age was 42 years. For every 100 females, there were 106.8 males.  For every 100 females age 18 and over, there were 99.2 males.

The median household income was $32,292 and the median family income  was $34,167. Males had a median income of $28,571 versus $18,125 for females. The per capita income for the unorganized territory was $14,180.  About 1.9% of families and 3.6% of the population were below the poverty line, including none of those under age 18 and 10.3% of those age 65 or over.

References

Populated places in Aitkin County, Minnesota
Unorganized territories in Minnesota